John Thomas Stanley, 1st Baron Stanley of Alderley (26 November 1766 – 23 October 1850), known as Sir John Stanley, 7th Baronet, from 1807 to 1839, was a British peer and politician.

Life
Stanley was the son of Sir John Thomas Stanley FRSE (1735–1827), 6th Baronet and elder brother of Edward Stanley, the Bishop of Norwich. He succeeded in the baronetcy and to the family seat at Alderley Park in Cheshire on his father's death in 1807. This branch of the Stanley family descended from the Hon. Sir John Stanley, third son of Thomas Stanley, 1st Baron Stanley (whose eldest son Thomas was created Earl of Derby in 1485). His mother was Margaret Owen, heiress of the Penrhos estate on Anglesey and he was appointed High Sheriff of Anglesey for 1809.

He was elected to the House of Commons for Wootton Bassett in 1790, a seat he held until 1796. He was also elected a Fellow of the Royal Society in 1790. In 1839 Stanley was raised to the peerage as Baron Stanley of Alderley, in the County of Chester.

Lord Stanley of Alderley died at Alderley Park in October 1850, aged 83, and was succeeded in his titles by his son Edward, who had already been elevated to the peerage in his own right as Baron Eddisbury.

Family
Stanley married the Hon. Maria Josepha, daughter of John Holroyd, 1st Earl of Sheffield, in 1796. Lady Stanley of Alderley died in 1863. There were 11 children of the marriage, with sons who were twins and seven daughters surviving to become adults. The sons included:

Hon. Edward John (1802–1869), elder twin who inherited the title;
Hon. William Owen Stanley (1802–1884), younger twin and Liberal Party politician

Of the daughters:

Lucy Anne married Marcus Theodore Hare.
Isabella Louisa (1801–1839) married William Parry, and was mother of Edward Parry.
Matilda Abigail married Henry John Adeane.

References 
Kidd, Charles, Williamson, David (editors). Debrett's Peerage and Baronetage (1990 edition). New York: St Martin's Press, 1990,

Notes 

1766 births
1850 deaths
Barons Stanley of Alderley
John
Fellows of the Royal Society
Members of the Parliament of Great Britain for English constituencies
British MPs 1790–1796
High Sheriffs of Anglesey
Peers of the United Kingdom created by Queen Victoria